Pacific Marine Energy Center (PMEC), formerly known as the Northwest National Marine Renewable Energy Center (NNMREC), is a partnership between Oregon State University, the University of Washington, and the University of Alaska Fairbanks. Oregon State University focuses on wave energy. University of Washington focuses on tidal energy. The three universities collaborate with each other on research, education, outreach, and engagement.

Partners in PMEC include: 
 National Renewable Energy Laboratory
 Pacific Northwest National Laboratory
 Public Utility District of Snohomish County No. 1
 BioSonics, Inc.
 Electric Power Research Institute
 Verdant Power
 Pacific Northwest Economic Region
 Sound & Sea Technology
 National Marine Fisheries Service
 Washington Department of Ecology

References

External links
 Pacific Marine Energy Center
 PMEC - OSU website
 PMEC - UW website

Science and technology in the United States
Renewable energy organizations based in the United States
Wave power
Tidal power
Science and technology in Oregon
Science and technology in Washington (state)